John Grant Robertson (born 2 October 1964) is a Scottish professional football coach and former player, who is currently the sporting director of Inverness Caledonian Thistle. His playing career included spells at Newcastle United, Dundee and Livingston, but he is best known for his two spells at Heart of Midlothian totalling about 18 years, where he is the club's all-time leading goalscorer. He has since managed Inverness Caledonian Thistle, Heart of Midlothian, Ross County, Livingston, Derry City and East Fife.

Playing career
Hibernian attempted to sign Robertson as a teenager but he asked for time to think the deal over; after Hibs refused, he signed for Heart of Midlothian along with school friend and fellow future internationalist Dave Bowman. Robertson eventually earned the moniker "The Hammer of Hibs" (in addition to his more standard nickname "Robbo") as he scored a record 27 goals in Edinburgh derby matches. In 1986, 20 league goals from Robertson helped Hearts to the brink of a league and cup double. A 27 league game unbeaten run ended with two Albert Kidd goals for Dundee in the last six minutes of the season allowing Celtic to overtake them to win the title. A week later, Hearts lost 3–0 to Aberdeen in the cup final. He scored 106 goals in 202 Hearts league games in this spell at Tynecastle Park.

He left Hearts to play for Newcastle United in April 1988. Robertson failed to score in 14 Newcastle competitive first team games and returned to Hearts in December of that year, and remained there for the next decade. In 1998 Hearts won the Scottish Cup with Robertson an unused substitute, earning him his only senior medal as a player. In this second spell at Hearts he scored at a much less prolific rate compared to his first spell, with this time 106 goals in 310 league games. After an earlier loan spell with Dundee scoring once in 4 league games, he left Tynecastle that summer. He joined Livingston as a player-coach, scoring 14 goals in 41 league games.

Robertson was also a Scottish international, playing on 16 occasions for Scotland. He made his debut against Romania in 1990, scoring in a 2–1 win. He missed out on selection for the UEFA Euro 1992 due to a hernia injury.

Coaching career

Inverness Caledonian Thistle (first spell)
Whilst playing for Livingston, Robertson became involved in the coaching side of the game. He left the club in season 2002–03 to become manager of Inverness Caledonian Thistle where he guided the Highland team to the SPL for the first time in their history.

Heart of Midlothian manager
In November 2004 he returned to Hearts as head coach and despite two cup semi-finals and a good season in Europe as well as finishing fifth in the league, he was sacked in May 2005.

Ross County
Robertson was appointed manager of Scottish First Division team Ross County in June 2005, but left by mutual consent after four months. He was then appointed manager of Livingston in February 2006, but was sacked in April 2007 after finishing sixth in the First Division.

Derry City
Robertson was appointed by League of Ireland side Derry City in July 2007. He took club out of the relegation battle to a safe mid table position and also won the FAI League Cup and qualified for the Setanta Cup before being dismissed by the new chairman and board of directors at Derry, and replaced by former Derry boss Stephen Kenny. In 2009, Robertson coached strikers at Scottish Premier League clubs Dundee United and Kilmarnock. In March 2010, Robertson helped coach the strikers at Hearts on a non-contract basis.

East Fife
Robertson was appointed manager of East Fife in October 2010. In September 2011, his East Fife side knocked SPL club Aberdeen out of the Scottish League Cup at Pittodrie Stadium. On 1 March 2012 it was announced that Robertson had left East Fife.

Inverness Caledonian Thistle (second spell)
In June 2017, Robertson returned to Inverness Caledonian Thistle as manager. On 24 March 2018, the club won the Scottish Challenge Cup. In the 2018/19 season, Inverness qualified for the promotion playoffs but were beaten in the semi-finals by Dundee United. Dundee then made an approach for Robertson, but this was rejected by Inverness. Inverness finished second in the 2019–20 Scottish Championship, which was curtailed due to the coronavirus pandemic.

In June 2020, his contract with Inverness was extended by two years. Robertson was placed on compassionate leave in February 2021, with Neil McCann given caretaker charge of the team in his absence. Robertson returned to Inverness in May 2021 as sporting director, with a new manager to be appointed.

Career statistics

Club

International appearances

International goals
Scores and results list Scotland's goal tally first

Managerial record

Honours

Player 
Heart of Midlothian
Scottish Premier Division:
Runner–up 1985–86, 1987–88, 1991–92
Scottish First Division: Promoted 1982–83
Scottish Cup: 1997–98
Runner–up 1985–86, 1995–96
Scottish League Cup:
Runner–up 1996–97

Livingston
Scottish Second Division: 1998–99

 Scotland U16
Victory Shield: 1980
Dentyne Trophy: 1980

Manager 
 Livingston Reserves

SFL Reserve West: 2000–01
SFL Reserve Cup: 1998–99, 2000–01

Inverness Caledonian Thistle

Scottish First Division: 2003–04
Runner–up 2019–20
Scottish Challenge Cup: 2003–04, 2017–18, 2019–20

Derry City

League of Ireland Cup: 2007

Individual
SPFA Young Player of the Year: 1983–84
Scottish Premier Division Top Scorer: 1989–90
SFL First Division Manager of the Year: 2003–04
Heart of Midlothian Hall of Fame inductee: 2006
Scottish Football Hall of Fame inductee: 2019
SFL Second Division Manager of Month: November 2010, October 2011
SPFL Championship Manager of Month: October 2017, March 2019

Notes

See also
List of footballers in Scotland by number of league appearances (500+)
List of footballers in Scotland by number of league goals (200+)

References

External links
 
 
 Hearts playing career stats at londonhearts.com

1964 births
Derry City F.C. managers
Dundee F.C. players
Heart of Midlothian F.C. managers
Heart of Midlothian F.C. players
Inverness Caledonian Thistle F.C. managers
League of Ireland managers
Living people
Livingston F.C. managers
Livingston F.C. non-playing staff
Livingston F.C. players
Newcastle United F.C. players
Scotland B international footballers
Scotland international footballers
Scotland under-21 international footballers
Scottish Football League managers
Scottish Football League players
Scottish football managers
Scottish footballers
Scottish Premier League managers
Footballers from Edinburgh
English Football League players
People educated at Portobello High School
Scottish league football top scorers
Association football forwards
Scottish Professional Football League managers
Scottish Football Hall of Fame inductees